Bailey Warren (born ) is a pet dog belonging to United States Senator Elizabeth Warren of Massachusetts. A male golden retriever, Bailey played a role in Warren's 2020 presidential campaign and was a fixture on the campaign trail, appearing in selfies alongside his owners.

Activities
Bailey was a 2018 gift from Warren's husband, Bruce Mann. The couple told CNN in an October 2019 interview that they had long been dog people, and that Bailey helped them keep calm and maintain "the illusion of normalcy". They had previously owned another golden retriever, Otis, who died in 2012.

During Warren's 2020 campaign, Bailey was featured in official and unofficial campaign merchandise including stickers, t-shirts, tote bags, and leashes.

He made several notable appearances on the campaign trail, including crashing a CNN interview in October 2019, appearing in a Fort Dodge, Iowa rally in January 2020, and serving as a surrogate while Warren was attending the Trump impeachment trial.

During the Iowa caucuses, The Des Moines Register credited Bailey as a "natural closer" in its endorsement of Warren.

Shortly after his owner announced the end of her presidential campaign on March 5, 2020, Bailey was filmed stealing a burrito presumed to belong to a Warren campaign staffer or press aid. The video of the incident went viral, attracting over 180,000 likes on Twitter. Many of Warren and Bailey's supporters jumped to his defense, maintaining that Bailey was "stress eating", and looking for "comfort food".

An unofficial Twitter fan account operated by Robert Abare, @FirstDogBailey, has over 30,000 followers.

See also 

 United States presidential pets
 Champ 
 Major
 Commander

References 

2018 animal births
Individual dogs in politics
Individual dogs in the United States
Elizabeth Warren